Dasvidaniya  is a 2008 Indian Hindi-language comedy drama film released on 7 November 2008.
The name of the movie is a pun on the list of ten things to be done before death made by Vinay Pathak, and is a play on the Russian phrase до свидания (do svidaniya), meaning bye.

Synopsis 
Amar Kaul (Vinay Pathak) is a 37-year-old accounts manager at a company called Suraj Pharmaceuticals in Mumbai. He is single and lives with his mother (Sarita Joshi). He lives a nondescript life with people oblivious to his existence. One day his doctor tells him that he will die within three months due to stomach cancer. Realising that his time is limited, Amar makes a list of ten things he wants to do during his life, and sets out to do them. They are:

 Buy a red car.
 Tour abroad.
 Play guitar.
 Confess his unrequited love for his childhood crush Neha.
 Stand up to his boss.
 Visit his old friend Rajiv Jhulka.
 Experience romance.
 Reveal his condition to his mother.
 Have his photo published in the newspaper.
 Mend his relationship with his younger brother.

He finds the true joys of life in a few months which was hidden all his life. After three months, at the time of his death, he leaves something for all his loved ones, leaving them happy and thankful to him.

Cast
 Vinay Pathak as Amar Kaul
 Neha Dhupia as Neha Bhanot
 Gaurav Gera as Vivek Kaul
 Rajat Kapoor as Rajiv Jhulka
 Sarita Joshi as Amar's mother
 Saurabh Shukla as Dasgupta, Amar's boss
 Suchitra Pillai as Suchi R. Jhulka
 Ranvir Shorey as Jagtap
 Suresh Menon as self
 Joy Fernandes as Savio
 Purbi Joshi as Garima
 Manoylo Svitlana as Tatanya
 Brijendra Kala as Shiraz

Soundtrack 

The music for all the songs were composed by Kailash Kher.

Release

Box office 
Dasvidaniya collected  in its lifetime run.

Critical reception 
The film received favourable reviews from critics. Martin D'Souza of Bollywood Trade News Network gave the movie 4 stars out of 5 calling it "a memorable experience, one that will leave you richer". Gaurav Malani of Indiatimes Movies gave the film 3 stars, praising the cast, dialogue and scripting and recommended that the movie "should top the list of your 10 most important things to do this weekend." The movie has also been referred by its pun line as "the best goodbye movie ever."

References

External links 
 
 

2000s Hindi-language films
2008 comedy-drama films
2008 films
Indian comedy-drama films
Films scored by Kailash Kher
2008 comedy films
2008 drama films